David L. Rosenhan (November 22, 1929 – February 6, 2012) was an American psychologist. He is best known for the Rosenhan experiment, a study challenging the validity of psychiatry diagnoses.

Biography
Rosenhan received his Bachelor of Arts degree in mathematics in 1951 from Yeshiva College, his master's degree in economics in 1953 and his doctorate in psychology in 1958, both from Columbia University. As further described in his obituary published by the American Psychological Association (APA), "Rosenhan was a pioneer in applying psychological methods to the practice of law, including the examination of expert witnesses, jury selection, and jury deliberation." He was a professor of law and of psychology at Stanford University from 1971 until his retirement in 1998... Before joining the Stanford Law School faculty, he was a member of the faculties of Swarthmore College, Princeton University, Haverford College, and the University of Pennsylvania. He also served as a research psychologist at the Educational Testing Service. He later became a professor emeritus in law and psychology at Stanford University. Rosenhan was a fellow of the American Association for the Advancement of Science and various psychological societies, including the APA, and had been a visiting fellow at Wolfson College at Oxford University.

Rosenhan died on February 6, 2012, at the age of 82.

Research

Rosenhan believed that there are seven main features of abnormality: suffering; maladaptiveness; vividness and unconventionality; unpredictability and loss of control; irrationality and incomprehensibility; observer discomfort; and violation of moral and ideal standards.

In 1973, Rosenhan published "On Being Sane in Insane Places", which describes what is now called the Rosenhan experiment. In this study report, Rosenhan uses "hard labeling" to argue that mental illnesses are manifested solely as a result of societal influence. The study experiments arranged for eight individuals with no history of psychopathology to attempt admission into twelve psychiatric hospitals, all with an aim for and subsequent admission with diagnoses of schizophrenia or bipolar disorder. The report goes on to describe psychiatrists then attempting to treat the individuals using psychiatric medications; all eight were described as being self-discharged within 7 to 52 days, after having stated that they accepted their diagnosis. Later, a research and teaching hospital challenged Rosenhan to run a similar experiment involving its own diagnosis and admission procedures, where psychiatric staff were warned that at least one pseudo-patient might be sent to their institution. In that study, 83 out of 193 new patients were believed by at least one staff member to be actors; in fact, Rosenhan reports having sent no actors. The study concluded that existing forms of diagnosis were grossly inaccurate in distinguishing individuals without mental disorders from those with mental disorders, a conclusion that resulted in an explosion of controversy. The Rosenhan experiment can be described as addressing the relationship between psychiatric and medical diagnoses and labeling theory, theorising that deviance is a product of external judgements, or labels, that can modify an individual's self-identity and change the way others respond to the labeled person. In this description, by negatively labeling those seen as deviant from standard cultural norms, the behavior of individuals may be adjusted to coincide with the terms used to describe them. In short, by actively labeling certain acts as deviant and others as normal, distinct stereotypes are created.

Criticism of research
 
In a 2019 book on Rosenhan by author Susannah Cahalan, The Great Pretender, the veracity and validity of the Rosenhan experiment was questioned; Cahalan argues that Rosenhan never published further work on the experiment's data, nor did he deliver on a book on it that he had promised. Moreover, she presents her inability to find the experiment's subjects, save two—a Stanford graduate student who had experiences similar to Rosenhan's, and one whose positive psychiatric hospital experience was excluded from the published results. As noted by Alison Abbott in a review of the book in the journal Nature, Kenneth J. Gergen, a Stanford University colleague stated that "some people in the department called him a bullshitter', a conclusion with which Cahalan appeared to be in agreement, although, Abbott writes, "[s]he cannot be completely certain that Rosenhan cheated. But she is confident enough to call her engrossing, dismaying book The Great Pretender."

Further pseudo-patient studies in the vein of Rosenhan have met with significant methodologic and other concerns.

Publications

References

External links

Obituary

20th-century American psychologists
Yeshiva University alumni
Columbia University alumni
Teachers College, Columbia University alumni
Psychiatric false diagnosis
Swarthmore College faculty
1929 births
2012 deaths
Stanford University faculty